Al-Wadi is a sub-district located in Al Udayn District, Ibb Governorate, Yemen. Al-Wadi had a population of  4748 as of 2004.

References 

Sub-districts in Al Makhadir District